Live!! Loud and Clear is the first extended play by Australian blues, rock and R&B band Jo Jo Zep & The Falcons. Released in December 1977 and released in February 1978 and limited to 5,000 copies. The EP peaked at number 53 on the Australian Kent Music Report.

Track listing

Charts

References 

1978 EPs
EPs by Australian artists
Live albums by Australian artists
Jo Jo Zep & The Falcons albums
Albums produced by Joe Camilleri